Busch Properties, Inc.  (BPI), is a corporation, which operates resort, residential and commercial properties in the United States. It was established in 1969 as a subsidiary of Anheuser-Busch, Inc. (AB), the largest brewing company in the United States, which is based in St. Louis, Missouri. BPI's four main functions include business park development, resort and residential development, corporate real estate and employee residential relocation for the parent company and other AB subsidiaries.

Busch Properties primarily develops and manages properties located on land near the parent company's brewery facilities, such as the  Busch Corporate Center adjacent to the company's St. Louis brewery.

Notable among BPI developments were the Kingsmill Resort, the Kingsmill planned community residential development, Busch Office Park at McLaws Circle, and Busch Commerce Park, all located near the company's brewery in James City County near Williamsburg, Virginia. Busch Entertainment, another AB subsidiary, operates the Busch Gardens Williamsburg and Water Country USA theme parks nearby the James City brewery as well.

In 2008, Dun and Bradstreet reported annual gross sales of BPI as US$61 million.

On June 24, 2010 it was announced by Robin Carson, Executive VP with BPI, that BPI has decided not to exercise the option to bid for or extend its agreement to provide management services to the Kingsmill Community Services Association after December 31, 2010. This coupled with the InBev sale in October, 2009 of Busch Gardens Williamsburg, Water Country USA and eight other theme park to Blackstone Group significantly reduces the amount of real estate BPI is managing.

The following month, in July 2010, it was announced that Busch Properties had entered into an agreement with Xanterra Parks and Resorts to purchase and operate the Kingsmill Resort. In 1968, Xanterra became the successor to the Fred Harvey Company initially established by entrepreneur Fred Harvey beginning in 1875. One of Xanterra's more famous locations is located at the Grand Canyon in Arizona. Xanterra (owned by Anschutz since 2008) has traditionally operated in national and state parks across the United States, especially in the Western regions. Other high-profile operations include Yellowstone National Park in Wyoming and Crater Lake National Park in Oregon. Owned by Denver-based billionaire Philip Anschutz since, 2008, prior to the Kingsmill announcement, Xanterra was operating about three dozen hotels and lodges with more than 5,000 guest rooms combined, with over 8,000 employees.

References

Anheuser-Busch
Companies based in St. Louis